Joseph Stanley Holmes, 1st Baron Dovercourt (31 October 1878 – 22 April 1961) was a British chartered accountant, businessman and Liberal Party politician, who later served as a Liberal National Member of Parliament.

Background and education
Holmes was born in Marylebone, Middlesex, the son of Horace G. Holmes, JP. He was educated at the City of London School.

Career
Holmes was a chartered accountant and company director. He served as vice-president of the Building Societies Association and was a member of the London County Council 1910 to 1919. He was elected Liberal Member of Parliament for North East Derbyshire at the 1918 general election, but narrowly lost the seat at the 1922 general election. The initially declared majority was only 5 votes, and an electoral petition was lodged. The petition was dismissed when a recount found a higher majority of 15.

Holmes then stood unsuccessfully in Dunbartonshire at the 1923 general election, and in Cheltenham at the 1924 election. He finally returned to the House of Commons after a thirteen-year absence at the 1935 general election, when he was elected for Harwich as a Liberal National. He held the seat until 1954, sitting later as a 'National Liberal and Conservative'. He introduced as Private Member's Bills the Inheritance (Family Provision) Act 1938 and the Coast Protection Act 1939. On 18 January 1954 he was elevated to the peerage as Baron Dovercourt, of Harwich in the County of Essex.

Personal life
Lord Dovercourt married Eva Gertrude, daughter of William Thomas Rowley, in 1905. He died in Marylebone, London, in April 1961, aged 82. The barony became extinct on his death.

References

External links 
 

1878 births
1961 deaths
Liberal Party (UK) MPs for English constituencies
Members of London County Council
People educated at the City of London School
Members of the Parliament of the United Kingdom for constituencies in Derbyshire
UK MPs 1918–1922
UK MPs 1935–1945
UK MPs 1945–1950
UK MPs 1950–1951
UK MPs 1951–1955
UK MPs who were granted peerages
People from Marylebone
Progressive Party (London) politicians
National Liberal Party (UK, 1931) politicians
Hereditary barons created by Elizabeth II